Antoinette M. Burton is an American historian, and Professor of History and Bastian Professor of Global and Transnational Studies at the University of Illinois, Urbana-Champaign. Along with Catherine Hall, Mrinalini Sinha, and Tony Ballantyne her work has helped define the "new imperial history". With Tony Ballantyne she has helped define a new approach to world history that focuses on colonialism, race and gender. On November 23, 2015, Burton was named Chair of the University of Illinois' search for a permanent Chancellor after the resignation of Phyllis Wise.

Since 2015, Antoinette Burton has served as the Director of the Humanities Research Institute (formerly the Illinois Program for Research in the Humanities) at the University of Illinois, Urbana-Champaign. In this role she has spearheaded initiatives in humanities research, education and outreach, and social justice at UIUC within the state of Illinois, and throughout the Midwest region through programs such as Humanities Without Walls, the Odyssey Project, and the Education Justice Project.

She was named a 2018 Presidential Fellow for the University of Illinois system along with Wendy Lee,  and in 2019, she was named the Maybelle Leland Swanlund Endowed Chair at the University of Illinois, Urbana-Champaign.

Awards
2010 Guggenheim Fellowship
2014 NEH Fellowship

Works
 Histories of a Radical Book: E. P. Thompson and The Making of the English Working Class. Berghahn Books, 2020. 
 Animalia: An Anti-Imperial Bestiary for Our Times (with Renisa Mawani). Duke University Press, 2020. 
 The Trouble With Empire: Challenges to Modern British Imperialism Duke University Press, 2015. 
 Ten Books That Shaped the British Empire: Creating an Imperial Commons (with Isabel Hofmeyr). Duke University Press, 2014. 
 An Illinois Sampler: Teaching and Research on the Prairie (with Mary-Ann Winkelmes). University of Illinois Press, 2014. 
 Empires and the Reach of the Global: 1870-1945 (with Tony Ballantyne). Harvard University Press, 2014. 
 The First Anglo-Afghan Wars: A Reader. Duke University Press, 2014. 
 A Primer for Teaching World History: Ten Design Principles. Duke University Press, 2011. 
 Empire in Question: Reading, Writing, and Teaching British Imperialism. Duke University Press, 2011. 
 Moving Subjects: Gender, Mobility and Intimacy in an Age of Global Empire. University of Illinois Press, 2008. 
 The Postcolonial Careers of Santha Rama Rau. Duke University Press, 2007. 
 Bodies in Contact: Rethinking Colonial Encounters in World History. Tony Ballantyne, Antoinette M. Burton, Duke University Press, 2005. 
 Archive stories: facts, fictions, and the writing of history, Editor Antoinette M. Burton, Duke University Press, 2005, 
 "When Was Britain? Nostalgia for the Nation at the End of the “American Century," The Journal of Modern History Vol. 75, No. 2, June 2003.   
 Dwelling in the Archive: Women Writing House, Home and History in Late Colonial India. Oxford University Press, 2003. 
 After the Imperial Turn: Thinking with and through the Nation, Duke University Press, 2003, 
 Politics and Empire in Victorian Britain: A Reader, Editor Antoinette M. Burton, Palgrave Macmillan, 2001, 
 Gender, Sexuality and Colonial Modernities (editor). Routledge, 1999. 
 At the Heart of the Empire: Indians and the Colonial Encounter in Late Victorian Britain. University of California Press, 1998. 
 Burdens of History: British Feminists, Indian Women and Imperial Culture, 1865-1915. University of North Carolina Press, 1994. 
 Review article Not Even Remotely Global? Method and Scale in World History History Workshop Journal, no. 64 (Autumn 2007), pp. 323 - 328, Oxford University press
 Burdens of History: British Feminists, Indian Women and Imperial Culture, 1865-1915. University of North Carolina Press, 1994.

References

External links
"Book Review", American Historical Review, October 1999
"Antoinette Burton, Burdens of History: British Feminists, Indian Women, and Imperial Culture, 1865-1915.(Book review)", Nineteenth-Century Prose, September 22, 1996

1961 births
Yale University alumni
University of Chicago alumni
University of Illinois Urbana-Champaign faculty
Living people
21st-century American historians
Historians of the British Empire
American women historians
21st-century American women writers